Kawahigashi Station is the name of two train stations in Japan:

 Kawahigashi Station (Fukushima)
 Kawahigashi Station (Saga)